William Francis (21 March 1856 – 28 April 1917) was an English cricketer. Francis was a right-handed batsman. He was born at Little Waltham, Essex.

Francis made his first-class debut for Sussex against Lancashire in 1877 at the Old Trafford. He made eight further first-class appearances for Sussex, the last of which came against the Marylebone Cricket Club at Lord's in 1879. In his nine first-class appearances, he scored a total of 83 runs at an average of 6.91, with a high score of 17.

He died at Forest Gate, Essex, on 28 April 1917.

References

External links
William Francis at ESPNcricinfo
William Francis at CricketArchive

1856 births
1917 deaths
People from the City of Chelmsford
English cricketers
Sussex cricketers